Alan Brown is an American director and author active in the twenty-first century.

Filmmaker
Brown's first film, the half-hour narrative O Beautiful, won the Future Filmmaker Award at the 2002 Palm Springs International Short Film Festival, and was an official selection of the 2003 Sundance Film Festival.  Singled out by critics as "powerful and ultimately beautiful", and "a rare piece of film making", it is available on the Strand Releasing DVD, Boys Life 4.

Brown's feature debut, Book of Love, which stars Simon Baker, Frances O'Connor, Gregory Smith, and Bryce Dallas Howard, was praised by critics for its "creepy eroticism and sly intelligence", and as "a movie that feels about as real as it's possible to be". It premiered in the Dramatic Competition at the 2004 Sundance Film Festival, and was broadcast on Showtime, the Sundance Channel, and Starz.

His second feature film, Superheroes, the story of an Iraq War veteran with posttraumatic stress disorder, has been described by critics as "wrenching" and "brimming with rare compassion". It was the winner of numerous prizes, including the Feature Filmmaker’s Award at the 2007 Avignon/New York Film Festival, the Maverick Spirit Award at the 2008 Cinequest Film Festival, Special Jury Mention at the Austin Film Festival 2008, and both the Narrative Feature and Best Film Awards at the 2008 Brooklyn Arts Council International Film Festival.

Brown's third feature, Private Romeo is a contemporary adaptation of Shakespeare's Romeo and Juliet set in an all-male high school military academy. The film stars New York stage actors Seth Numrich, Matt Doyle, and Hale Appleman. Singled out by critics for being "hugely adventurous and highly liberated," Private Romeo was a New York Times Critics Pick and won a Grand Jury Prize at Outfest 2011.

Brown's most recent narrative feature film Five Dances was shot in New York City in the winter of 2012. Set in the downtown modern dance world, Five Dances shows dancers performing choreography by Jonah Bokaer. The film was released in June, 2013 (at least in Paris, France).

Writer
Brown is also the author of the novel Audrey Hepburn's Neck, which was translated into eight languages and won the Pacific Rim Book Prize.   The recipient of National Endowment for the Arts and New York Foundation for the Arts fellowships, he was also awarded a Fulbright Fellowship in Journalism to Japan, where he lived for seven years.

Filmography
2002: O Beautiful (short)
2003: Boys Life 4: Four Play (segment O Beautiful) 
2004: Book of Love
2007: Superheroes 
2011: Private Romeo
2013: Five Dances

References

External links

Year of birth missing (living people)
Living people
American film directors